Richards Bay Minerals (RBM) is a South African mining company. RBM's principal product is titanium dioxide in the form of an 85% pure titanium dioxide slag; the company also produces the higher-purity 95% titanium dioxide product rutile as well as pig iron and zircon.

The company's principal operations are just north of Richards Bay in KwaZulu-Natal, South Africa, in a 2-kilometer wide by 17-kilometer long strip of mineral-rich sand dunes. The area is known as Zulti North mine lease area and will continue to be mined until 2030. RBM mines the using a dredge mining technique, extracting the titanium-iron ore ilmenite as well as rutile and zircon from the sand. This feedstock is then processed into RBM's product lines at a facility which sorts the various materials and processes them to varying degrees into marketable materials.

RBM is controlled by Rio Tinto which owns 74% of it. Blue Horizon Investments (24%) and RBM permanent employees (2%) also have an interest in the mine. Prior to 2012, BHP Billiton owned 37% but that interest was later purchased by Rio Tinto in February 2012.

In April 2019, Rio Tinto announced an investment into the Zulti South project, which is located south of Richards Bay, South Africa. The investment value is $463 million (6.5 billion South African rand) and is aimed at sustaining the mine's capacity and extending the life of the mine. Production from Zulti South will be processed through RBM's existing infrastructure (pipelines, a mineral separation plant and smelting facility). Construction is scheduled to start in mid-2019 and the first commercial production expected in late 2021.

References

BHP
Rio Tinto (corporation) subsidiaries
Surface mines in South Africa
Titanium mining
Mining companies of South Africa
Companies based in KwaZulu-Natal
Richards Bay